The 2021 UNAF U-20 Tournament is the 14th edition of the UNAF U-20 Tournament. The tournament will take place in Tunisia, from 8 to 17 November 2021.

Participants

Venues

Squads

Tournament

Matches

Champion

Scorers
4 goals
 Ely Housseinou Sy

2 goals
 Jorès Rahou
 Ahmed Helmi Abdelhamid
 Abderrahman Zaki Ahmed
 Abdallah Faraj Al Ferjani
 Ghaith Whaibi
 Mohamed Amine Kechiche
 Youssef Snana

1 goal

 Sarvantes Casado Noa
 Idriss Bounaas
 Ahmed Cherif Zaki
 Ahmed Fathi Abdelwahab
 Fahd Mohamed
 Mohamed Ali Diadié
 Issa M’Bareck
 Yassine Dridi
 Makram Sghaïer
 Adem Garreb
 Malcom Jamal Lahmidi
 Malek Mehri

Awards
 Golden ball: 
 Golden boot: 
 Golden glove: 
 Fair play trophy:

References

External links
قرعة دورة اتحاد شمال افريقيا لمنتخبات مواليد 2003  - UNAF official website

2021 in African football
UNAF U-20 Tournament
UNAF U-20 Tournament